Clypeasteridae is a family of sea urchins in the order Clypeasteroida. This family was first scientifically described in 1835 by the Swiss-American biologist Louis Agassiz. 

The clypeasteridae also known as the sand dollar, are round and semi-flat organisms with spines lining the underside of the body and elongated genital papillae aiding its survival and reproduction. The spines help them move along the sea floor to feed and increase in density to burrow the sediment while avoiding predators. The elongated genital papillae allow the sand dollar to asexually reproduce undisrupted under the sediment as the gametes are released into the water and later fertilized by male clypeasteridae.

Genera 
The World Register of Marine Species list the following genera as being in this family:-

Ammotrophus H.L. Clark, 1928
Arachnoides Leske, 1778
Clypeaster Lamarck, 1801
Fellaster Durham, 1955
Monostychia Laube, 1869

References 

 
Clypeasteroida
Echinoderm families